El Chocolate (Antonio Núñez Montoya, 4 May 1931 – 19 June 2005) was a Flamenco singer from Seville.  He was one of the stars of Carlos Saura's film Flamenco.

Background 
Montoya was born in Jerez de la Frontera and was related to the Montoya clan. He grew up in Seville.

Career 
He appeared in the film Los Torantos and recorded music with Niño Ricardo and Melchor de Marchena.

Recognition 
He was awarded the second Giraldillo del Cante award in 2002.

Death 
He was supposed to perform in July 2005 at the 40th Caracol Festival de Flamenco in Lebrija, but cancelled because of his ailing health. He died in Seville on 19 July of cancer in his home in Seville.

Partial discography
 Antonio Núñez 'El Chocolate' (Belter, 1968)
 Mano a Mano El Chocolate/ Fosforito (Belter 1970)
 Antonio Núñez 'El Chocolate' (Trama, 1977)
 Los Cantes de El Chocolate (SAEF, 1980)
 50 Años de Flamenco, 1935–1985 (Olympo, 1985)
 Los Cantes de El Chocolate (Perfil, 1986)
 El Chocolate, Maestros del Cante (Hispavox, 1987)
 El Chocolate, Maestros del Flamenco (Hispavox, 1988)
 Antonio Núñez 'El Chocolate', Flamenco de Hoy (Coliseum, 1990)
 Si Yo Volviera a Nacer (Senador, 1996)
 Mis 70 años con el Cante (Palo Nuevo/Muxxic, 2001)

References

 Pohren, Donn: Lives and Legends of Flamenco (Society of Spanish Studies, 1988)
 World Music Central

Singers from Andalusia
Flamenco singers
1930 births
2005 deaths
20th-century Spanish male singers
20th-century Spanish singers